In anatomy, an arcuate line is any structure that is curvilinear. 

 Arcuate line (anterior abdominal wall), a term from human abdominal anatomy
 Arcuate line (ilium), the inner edge of the pelvis

See also
 Arcuate (disambiguation)